Pennfield is a community in the incorporated rural community of Eastern Charlotte, New Brunswick. It is also referred to as Pennfield Corner, Pennfield Station, and Pennfield Ridge. Pennfield intersects with Route 1, Route 175, Route 176, Route 778, and Route 785 highways.

History

In 1783, several hundred members of The Religious Society of Friends moved from the newly founded United States of America to Pennfield as a result of The American Revolution.

During the summer of 1940, an airport was constructed to train Air Observes as part of the British Commonwealth Air Training Plan. An Operational Training Unit was used at the airport to train the four members of the crew for World War II action: Pilot, Navigator, Wireless Air Gunner and Air Gunner. The Royal Canadian Air Force allowed the Royal Canadian Navy to use their equipment for High Frequency Direction Finding activities against German submarines in the Atlantic.

In October 2012, Pennfield had a major highway route change when a realignment of Route 1 opened, creating a continuous freeway from the American Border to the Trans-Canada Highway at River Glade.

Education
Pennfield had one elementary school, Pennfield Elementary, which closed in the fall of 2015.

Climate
This climatic region is typified by large seasonal temperature differences, with warm to hot (and often humid) summers and cold (sometimes severely cold) winters.  According to the Köppen Climate Classification system, Pennfield has a humid continental climate, abbreviated "Dfb" on climate maps.

Notable people

James McKay

See also
List of communities in New Brunswick

References

Communities in Charlotte County, New Brunswick